The Mashhad derby, also known as the Razavi Khorasan derby, is a football local derby match between the four most popular clubs from Mashhad: Aboomoslem and Payam and Siah Jamegan and Padideh. In the 1980s and early 1990s, it was Iran's second most important derby after the Tehran derby. It has lost its status to more popular derbies such as Isfahan derby, Ahwaz derby, Tabriz derby, Gilan derby and Shiraz derby.

History
Historically, the top two football clubs from Mashhad, F.C. Aboomoslem and Payam Khorasan, would face their chief rival in this derby from 1984 until 1989 and later in 1991-1992 when competing in Mashhad Football League and Khorasan Football League. F.C. Aboomoslem was owned by Iran Police Force and Payam Khorasan owned by Ministry of Post and Telecommunications. The derby venue, Takhti Stadium, would fill with respective fans carrying their club's banner color: black—Aboomoslem; green—Payam Mashhad. Aboomoslem's fanbase were generally from Saadabad Square, Sanabad Street and Abkooh. Payam's fanbase were generally from Tabarsi Street.

In the 1990s both sides rotated turns playing in Azadegan League and Second Division. In 2001, they would again face each other in this derby in the playoff round of Division Two for promotion to Azadegan League.

In 2008, both sides would play in Iran's main league Persian Gulf Cup and thus renewed their derby encounters.

Results

Notable derby players

Aboomoslem
Mohammad Azam
Khodadad Azizi
Hadi Bargizar
Hossein Ebadzadeh
Seyed Kazem Ghiyassian
Alireza Gil Arab
Reza Jahedi
Asghar Jandari
Saeed Jooshesh
Akbar Misaghian
Hossein Omidvar
Shahriyar Rezaei
Saeed Sayyami
Hossein Shamlou
Saeed Khani
Shahab Gordan
Mehdi Sabeti
Daniel Olerum
Jean Black Ngody

Payam
Reza Attarzadeh
Gholam Asghari
Hassan Asghari
Majid Hosseinipour
Hamid Ghasemzadeh
Mohsen Nasseri
Fereydoun Mehryar
Mohammad Momeni
Hashem Rahbardar
Seyed Jafar Sadat
Reza Sahebi
Gholam Salari
Mohammad Tashakkori
Younes Masoudi
Hossein Hooshyar
Sirous Sangchouli
Mojtaba Sarasiaei
Shpejtim Arifi
Diego Benedito Galvão Máximo

Siah Jamegan vs. Padideh

References

Sport in Mashhad
Football derbies in Iran